Alain Goraguer (20 August 1931 – 13 February 2023) was a French jazz pianist, sideman of Boris Vian and Serge Gainsbourg, arranger and composer.

Goraguer was a composer/arranger of music for Serge Gainsbourg, Jean Ferrat, Serge Reggiani and Nana Mouskouri.

In 1965 he was the orchestra conductor for Luxembourg's winning entry in the Eurovision Song Contest, "Poupée de cire, poupée de son". (Though it represented Luxembourg, the song had an entirely French creative team behind it, as it was sung by France Gall, written by Gainsbourg, and conducted by Goraguer.)

He composed some or all of the music for films including La Planète Sauvage (1973), La Vie de bohème (1992), Deux jours à tuer (2008) and Saint Laurent (2014).

Goraguer died on 13 February 2023, at the age of 91.

Composer

Soundtracks

See also
 List of jazz arrangers

References

External links

 https://rateyourmusic.com/artist/alain_goraguer - list of songs
 

1931 births
2023 deaths
People from Rosny-sous-Bois
French film score composers
French male film score composers
French people of Breton descent
Eurovision Song Contest conductors
21st-century conductors (music)
21st-century French male musicians